Ummerstadt is a town in the region Heldburger Land in district of Hildburghausen, in Thuringia, Germany. It is situated 19 km south of Hildburghausen, and 11 km west of Coburg.

Sons and daughters of the town 

 Johann Georg Rosenmüller (1736-1815), Superintendent of the Leipzig Thomaskirche
 Friedrich Konrad Müller (1823-1881), poet
 Erich Scharf (1908-1943), Communist worker, Thuringian Communist Party representative, protector and military service soldier.

References

Towns in Thuringia
Hildburghausen (district)
Duchy of Saxe-Meiningen